Jean Randriamamitiana (born 19 June 1973) is a Malagasy sprinter. He competed in the men's 100 metres at the 2000 Summer Olympics.

References

1973 births
Living people
Athletes (track and field) at the 2000 Summer Olympics
Malagasy male sprinters
Olympic athletes of Madagascar
Place of birth missing (living people)